100 años de mariachi is the title of a studio album released by Spanish performer Plácido Domingo. It was released on October 5, 1999, by EMI Latin. Domingo was awarded the Best Mexican-American/Tejano Music Performance at the 42nd Grammy Awards. By 2002, the album had sold over 2.5 million copies.

Track listing

Chart performance

Sales and certifications

See also
List of best-selling Latin albums

References

1999 albums
Plácido Domingo albums
Spanish-language albums
Ranchera albums
EMI Latin albums
Albums produced by Bebu Silvetti
Covers albums
Grammy Award for Best Mexican/Mexican-American Album